is a Japanese competitor in synchronized swimming.

She won 2 bronze medals at the 2017 World Aquatics Championships and 3 gold medals at the 2016 Asian Swimming Championships.

References

Living people
Japanese synchronized swimmers
1996 births
World Aquatics Championships medalists in synchronised swimming
Sportspeople from Tokyo
Synchronized swimmers at the 2017 World Aquatics Championships
Hosei University alumni
21st-century Japanese women